Jane Ray (born 11 June 1960) is an English illustrator of more than 70 children's books. The first book Jane illustrated A Balloon for Grandad written by Nigel Gray, is included in 1001 Children's Books You Must Read Before You Grow Up. She is the writer and illustrator of some including Can You Catch a Mermaid? (Orchard Books), Ahmed and the Feather Girl (Frances Lincoln), and The Elephants Garden (Boxer Books). She won the 1992 Nestlé Children's Book Prize in the 6- to 8-year-old readers category for the Story of the Creation, published by Orchard Books, and has been shortlisted for the Kate Greenaway Medal several times. She was also a nominee for the Biennial of Illustration Bratislava 2017.

Early life 
Jane Ray was born in Chingford, London and is the daughter of Donald Edwin and Barbara May, both teachers and musicians. Her interest in literature started at a young age with Alice in Wonderland being the first book she ever read. Ray started making books at age five during a summer holiday, her first book which she still owns is called Mr Teddy and Mrs Teddy go for a picnic. She produced a total of thirty books at this time. One of Ray's most prominent influences is Beatrix Potter, of whom she says:"I was fascinated by detail of her work. She was a scientist as well as an artist and I found that mixture of extremely detailed observation of the natural world and the pure fantasy of ‘dormice in bonnets’ captivating. I used to ‘go into’ those illustrations – imagined I was walking along that lane in Tom Kitten, or sitting amongst the foxgloves in Jemima Puddleduck or walking up the stairs of the doll’s house in The Tale of Two Bad Mice".Other early influences of Ray's include Lucy Boston, Brian Wildsmith, Arthur Rackham and Jan Pienkowski.

Ray cites her art teacher at school as an influence on her decision to go to art school. She later completed a degree course at Middlesex University in Ceramics and 3 Dimensional Design. She initially wanted to teach deaf children.

Career 
Before becoming an author and illustrator, Ray worked in a variety of jobs including a life model, special needs teacher, telephone cleaner and mural artist. Ray began her career by designing greetings cards and wrapping paper published by Roger La Borde. Her first full colour picture book, A Balloon for Grandad by Nigel Gray was published in 1989. She has illustrated books by Carol Ann Duffy (The Lost Happy Endings, pub. Bloomsbury), Jeanette Winterson (The King of Capri, Bloomsbury), Michael Rosen (Romeo and Juliet, Walker Books) and Kevin Crossley-Holland (Heartsong, Orchard Books).

Ray takes a hands-on approach to her work, preferring not to use digital technology. She often uses watercolours with pencils, as well as collage and metallic inks to make distinctive decorative patterns. Ray takes a cross-cultural approach to her work, often looking for inspiration in the British Museum. She emphasises the importance of identity in her work and how children can relate to the story's characters at a personal level. Multi-culturalism is an important aspect of Ray's work, with her stating:"The children I meet are ethnically diverse, and I would frankly, be embarrassed if my "audience" wasn't represented in the books I am making for them. So, from the beginning of my career I have included characters of different ethnicities, and I have particularly enjoyed bringing those differences to the traditional "flaxen haired" European traditions of Grimm, Perrault and Andersen."In 2016 Ray contributed towards the Nightingale Project which 'brightens up hospitals through the arts'. She produced works for Shannon Ward women's psychiatric intensive care unit at St. Charles Hospital in West London. The project was later extended to Central and North West London NHS Foundation Trust. Ray's work was also displayed at the South Kensington and Chelsea Mental Health Centre. It was opened by Lord Fowler, the Lord Speaker of the House of Lords on the 1st of December 2016. In her work for this project Ray primarily depicted natural imagery such as trees as a way to connect outside life with the wards. Although common in her work, she specifically included birds as they represent freedom. When talking about the project, Ray claims it was 'liberating working on a much larger scale' and says it allowed for her artistic development.

Ray works in a studio located in her garden in London and uses postcards and cuttings to inspire her work.

She was nominated by IBBY UK as the British Nominee for the 2018 Hans Christian Andersen Award.

Personal life 
Ray lives and works in London. She is married to conductor David Anthony Temple and has 3 children.

Bibliography

As Illustrator: 

 A Balloon for Grandad – by Nigel Gray, Orchard
 Casting a Spell and Other Poems – anthology by Angela Huth, Orchard
 Island of the Children – anthology by Angela Huth, Orchard
 The Orchard Book of Creation Stories – Margaret Mayo, Orchard
 The Orchard Book of Mythical Birds and Beasts – Margaret Mayo, Orchard
 The Orchard Book of Magical Tales – Margaret Mayo, Orchard
 The Orchard Book of Love and Friendship – Geraldine Mccaughrean, Orchard
 Heartsong – Kevin Crossley Holland, Orchard
 The Unicorn Prince – Saviour Pirotta, Orchard
 Song of the Earth – Mary Hoffman, Orion
 Sun, Moon and Stars – Mary Hoffman, Orion Arion and the Dolphin – Vikram Seth, Orion
 Mother Gave a Shout – edited by Morag Styles and Suzanna Steele,
 Fairy Tales – retold by Berlie Doherty, Walker Books
 The Bold Boy – Malachy Doyle, Walker Books
 Lugalbanda – Kathy Henderson, Walker Books
 Shakespeare's Romeo and Juliet – Michael Rosen, Walker Books
 Hummingbirds – Nicola Davies, Walker Books
 The King of Capri – Janette Winterson, Bloomsbury
 The Lost Happy Endings – Carol Ann Duffy, Bloomsbury
 Jinnie Ghost – Berlie Doherty, Frances Lincoln
 Greek Myths – Sally Pomme Clayton, Frances Lincoln
 Zeraffa Giraffa – Dianne Hofmeyr, Frances Lincoln
 The Glass Makers Daughter – Dianne Hofmeyr, Frances Lincoln
 The Moonbird – Joyce Dunbar, Doubleday
 Stories for a Fragile Planet – Keneth Steven, Lion Hudson
 Classic Christmas Stories – Mary Joslin, Lion Children's Books
 The Stolen Childhood and Other Dark Fairy Tales – Carol Ann Duffy, Penguin
 From a Distance – Julie Gold, Dutton
 Myths and Legends of the Near East – Rachel Storm, The Folio Society
 Celtic Myths and Legends – Caitlin and John Matthews, The Folio Society
 The Arabian Nights – Powys/Mathews, Folio Society
 Corey's Rock – Sita Brahmachari, Otter-Barry Books
 Worry Angels – Sita Brahmachari, Barrington Stoke
 The Dolls House – Rumer Godden, Macmillan
 The Fairy Doll – Rumer Godden, Macmillan
 Give the Ball to the Poet – poetry anthology edited by Georgie Horrell, Aisha Spencer and Morag Styles, Commonwealth Education Trust Books
 The Pied Piper – Collins Big Cat

As Author and Illustrator 

 Can You Catch a Mermaid? – Orchard
 The Apple Pip Princess – Orchard
 The Dolls House Fairy – Orchard
 Ahmed and the Feather Girl – Frances Lincoln
 The Elephant's Garden – Boxer Books

As Adaptor and Illustrator 

 Noah's Ark – OrchardThe Story of the Creation – Orchard
 The Story of Christmas – Orchard
 The Happy Prince – Orchard
 Adam and Eve and the Garden of Eden – Eden Project
 The Twelve Dancing Princesses – Orchard
 Hansel and Gretel – Walker Books
 Snow White – (pop-up) – Walker Books
 Cinderella – (pop-up) – Walker Books
 The Twelve Days of Christmas – Orchard Books
 The Nutcracker – Orchard Books
 The Emperors Nightingale and other Feathery Tales – Boxer Books
 The Little Mermaid and other Fishy Tales – Boxer Books
 The Lion and the Unicorn and other Hairy Tales – Boxer Books

As Contributor 

 Lines in the Sand – Mary Hoffman and Rhiannon Lassiter, Frances Lincoln
 Frances Lincoln A Collection of Just So Stories – Rudyard Kipling, Walker Books
 Play the Shape Game – Anthony Browne, Walker Books
 Fairy Tales of Hans Christian Andersen – Folio Society
 Dare to be Different – Amnesty International
 We Are All Born Free – Amnesty International
 Over the Hills and far Away – Frances Lincoln
 The Orchard Book of Stories from the Opera – Orchard
 Just So Stories – Walker Books
 Under the Sun and Over the Sea – John Agard and Grace Nichols, Walker Books

Prizes and Awards 

 1989 shortlisted for the Mother Goose Award for A Balloon For Grandad.
 1991 shortlisted for the Kate Greenaway Award for Noah's Ark.
 1992 shortlisted for the Kate Greenaway Award for The Story of Christmas.
 1992 winner of the Smarties Award (6–8 years) for The Story of Creation.
 1992 winner of Nestlé Children's Book Prize in the 6- to 8-year-old readers category for the Story of the Creation, published by Orchard Books.
 1995 shortlisted for the Kate Greenaway Award for The Happy Prince.
 1995 shortlisted for the Kurt Maschler Award for The Song of the Earth.
 2001 shortlisted for the Kate Greenaway Award for Fairy Tales.
 2005 shortlisted for the Kate Greenaway Award for Jinnie Ghost.
 2008 shortlisted for the Kate Greenaway Award for The Lost Happy Endings.
 2017 nominated for the Biennial of Illustration Bratislava.
 2018 BBY UK Illustrator nominee for the Hans Christian Andersen Awards.

References

External links

 
 Profile at publisher Walker Books
  (mainly previous page of browse report, under 'Ray, Jane' without '1960–')

1960 births
English illustrators
English children's writers
British children's book illustrators
20th-century illustrators of fairy tales
Alumni of Middlesex University
People from Muswell Hill
Living people